Lake Pohenegamook (Lac Pohénégamook) is a Canadian lake located in Temiscouata Regional County Municipality (MRC), in administrative region of Bas-Saint-Laurent, in southeastern Quebec immediately north of the International Boundary with Maine at Aroostook County. It is the source of the Saint Francis River.

Geography
Oriented north-south, the lake is nestled in a valley in the Notre Dame Mountains, part of the Appalachian Range. Route 289 runs along the southern and western shores through the municipality of Pohénégamook - an amalgamation of several villages.

The National Transcontinental Railway constructed its mainline from Winnipeg, Manitoba to Moncton, New Brunswick along the western and southern shores in 1912 - today this line forms the mainline of CN Rail between Halifax, Nova Scotia and Montreal, Quebec.

The community of Estcourt Station, Maine (the northernmost point in New England) is located immediately south of the CN railway line at the lake's southern shore.

Toponymy 

The place name "Lake Pohenegamook" was formalized on December 5, 1968, at the Commission de toponymie du Québec (Quebec Names Board).

Legend
According to legend, a monster that looks like an upturned canoe covered in scales called the Ponik lives in the lake. Its possible the monster's appearance was conceived from the mistaken observation of a sturgeon, from stories of sea serpents or from logs floating in the lake's waters. The legend of Ponik has a positive impact on the lake and the city of Pohenegamook, as it makes them both more known to many Quebecers.

See also 

 Témiscouata Regional County Municipality (MRC)
 Pohénégamook, Quebec, a municipality
 Boucanée River, a stream
 Saint Francis River (Canada–United States), a stream
 Estcourt, Quebec, a village
 Estcourt Station, Maine

References

Pohenegamook
Tributaries of the Saint John River (Bay of Fundy)